Yenideğirmen, historically Yazlıbecer, is a village in the Elbeyli District, Kilis Province, Turkey. The village is inhabited by Turkmens of various tribes including Elbegli and had a population of 229 in 2022.

References

Villages in Elbeyli District